Andrew Porter (21 January 1937 – 7 October 2021) was a Scottish footballer who played for Hamilton Academical and Watford.

References

1937 births
2021 deaths
Scottish footballers
Hamilton Academical F.C. players
Watford F.C. players
Association footballers not categorized by position